Asghari is a town of Sahiwal District in the Punjab province of Pakistan. It is located at 30°28'0N 72°36'0E with an altitude of 155 metres (511 feet). Neighbouring settlements include Sikhanwala and Shujabad.

References

Populated places in Sahiwal District